Kenneth Milton Radick (June 17, 1907 – August 1987) was an American football end, guard, and tackle for the Green Bay Packers and Brooklyn Dodgers of the National Football League (NFL). He played college football for Indiana and Marquette. He won two NFL championships in 1930 and 1931.

Biography
Radick was born on June 17, 1907 in Green Bay, Wisconsin.

See also
Green Bay Packers players

References

1907 births
1987 deaths
Green Bay Packers players
Brooklyn Dodgers (NFL) players
Players of American football from Wisconsin
Sportspeople from Green Bay, Wisconsin